Ilin may refer to
Ilin Island in the Philippines
Ilin Island cloudrunner, a critically endangered cloud rat from Ilin Island
Ilyin, a Russian surname